The 25th Indian Infantry Brigade was an infantry brigade formation of the Indian Army during World War II. It was formed in February, 1941 at Ahmednagar in India and assigned to the 10th Indian Infantry Division. The brigade was attached to the 8th Indian Infantry Division in August 1941, and took part in the Anglo-Soviet invasion of Iran. Returning to the 10th Indian Division in August 1941, they arrived in the desert just in time for the Battle of Gazala and continued to fight in the Western Desert Campaign and later in the Italian Campaign. While in Italy the brigade was attached to the British 46th Infantry Division from 7 to 11 December 1944.

Formation
2nd Battalion, 11th Sikh Regiment March 1941 to March 1942 and June to August 1942
3rd Battalion, 9th Jat Regiment March 1941 to January 1942
1st Battalion, 5th Mahratta Light Infantry April 1941 to April 1942
2nd Battalion, 8th Gurkha Rifles June to July 1941 and October to November 1944
13th Duke of Connaught's Own Lancers August 1941
1st Battalion, King's Own Royal Regiment (Lancaster) November 1941 to October 1943
X Field Regiment, Royal Artillery May to June 1942	
3rd Battalion, 5th Mahratta Light Infantry June 1942 to June 1943 and August 1944
164th Field Regiment, Royal Artillery June to August 1942
4th Battalion, 13th Frontier Force Rifles August 1942 to February 1943
3rd Battalion, 18th Royal Garhwal Rifles May 1943 to August 1945
8th Battalion, King's Own Royal Regiment (Lancaster) November 1943 to December 1944, merged with 1st Battalion
1st Battalion, King's Own Royal Regiment (Lancaster) January 1944 to August 1945
2nd Battalion, 3rd Gurkha Rifles August 1944
Lovat Scouts August 1944 and March to April 1945
1st Battalion, 2nd Punjab Regiment August to September 1944
2nd Battalion, 4th Gurkha Rifles October 1944
4th Battalion, 10th Baluch Regiment October 1944
4th Battalion, 11th Sikh Regiment January to April 1945
3rd Battalion, 1st Punjab Regiment February to August 1945
2nd Battalion, Highland Light Infantry March to April 1945

Officers commanding
The following officers commanded the brigade during the war.
Brigadier R.G. Mountain (February 1941 to July 1942)
Brigadier A.E. Arderne (July 1942 onwards)

See also

 List of Indian Army Brigades in World War II

References

Military units and formations established in 1941
Military units and formations disestablished in 1945
British Indian Army brigades